Bojdan (also Romanized as Bojdān; also known as Bojdan-e Khvāshod) is a village in Khavashod Rural District, Rud Ab District, Sabzevar County, Razavi Khorasan Province, Iran. At the 2006 census, its population was 402, in 135 families.

References 

Populated places in Sabzevar County